4,4′-Methylenedianiline (MDA) is an organic compound with the formula CH2(C6H4NH2)2.  It is a colorless solid, although commercial samples can appear yellow or brown. It is produced on an industrial scale, mainly as a precursor to polyurethanes.

Synthesis and applications 
In the industrial production, MDA is produced by reaction of formaldehyde and aniline in the presence of hydrochloric acid.

MDA is consumed mainly as a precursor to Methylene diphenyl diisocyanate (MDI).  MDA is treated with phosgene to produce MDI.  MDI is a precursor to many polyurethane foams. Lower quantities are used as hardeners in epoxy resins and adhesives, as well as in the production of high-performance polymers.  Additionally, hydrogenation of MDA can be performed to produce 4,4,diaminodicyclohexylmethane, which is also used in polymer chemistry.

Safety
MDA is considered a potential occupational carcinogen by the US National Institute for Occupational Safety and Health. The Occupational Safety and Health Administration has set a permissible exposure limit at 0.01 ppm over an eight-hour time-weighted average, and a short-term exposure limit at 0.1 ppm.

It is suspected carcinogen. It is included in the "substances of very high concern" list of the European Chemicals Agency (ECHA).  The compound was blamed in a mass poisoning in the vicinity of Epping, Essex, United Kingdom during 1965 during which 84 individuals were poisoned through accidental contamination of flour used to make bread.

Related compounds
 4,4'-Thiodianiline
 4,4'-Oxydianiline
 Dapsone

References

External links 
 
 
 
 

Anilines
IARC Group 2B carcinogens
Mass poisoning